Imre Petneházy (13 April 1905 – 23 September 1972) was a Hungarian épée fencer and modern pentathlete. He competed in these two events at the 1932 Summer Olympics and placed 19th in the pentathlon.

References

External links
 

1905 births
1972 deaths
Hungarian male épée fencers
Hungarian male modern pentathletes
Olympic fencers of Hungary
Olympic modern pentathletes of Hungary
Fencers at the 1932 Summer Olympics
Modern pentathletes at the 1932 Summer Olympics
Sportspeople from Novi Sad
Hungarians in Vojvodina
20th-century Hungarian people